Celtic reconstructionism or CR (also Celtic reconstructionist paganism) is a polytheistic reconstructionist approach to Ancient Celtic religion, emphasising historical accuracy over eclecticism such as is found in most forms of Celtic neopaganism such as Neo-druidism. It is an effort to reconstruct and revive, in a modern Celtic cultural context, pre-Christian Celtic religions.

Celtic Reconstructionist Paganism originated in discussions among amateur scholars and Neopagans in the mid-1980s, and evolved into an independent tradition by the early 1990s. "Celtic Reconstructionist Paganism" (CR) is an umbrella term, with a number of recognized sub-traditions or denominations.

Origins

As modern paganism grew in scope and cultural visibility, some Euro-Americans saw the pre-Christian religions of their ancestors as being worthy of revival, and the study of mythology and folklore as a way to accomplish this. While most Neodruid groups of the period were primarily interested in "revitalizing the spirit of what they believe was the religious practice of pre-Roman Britain", the Celtic Reconstructionists (CRs) focused on only "reconstructing what can be known from the extant historical record."

Many of the people who eventually established CR were involved in modern pagan groups in the 1970s and 1980s. Much dialogue in the 1980s took place at workshops and discussions at pagan festivals and gatherings, as well as in the pages of pagan publications. This period, and these groups, are referred to in retrospect as "Proto-CR". Later, with the establishment of the Internet in the late 1980s and early 1990s, many of these groups and individuals came together online. This began a period of increased communication, and led to the growth of the movement.

The first appearance in print of the term "Celtic Reconstructionist", used to describe a specific religious movement and not just a style of Celtic studies, was by Kym Lambert ní Dhoireann  in the Spring, 1992 issue of Harvest Magazine. Ní Dhoireann credits Kathryn Price NicDhàna with originating the term “Celtic Reconstructionist”; however, NicDhàna credits her early use of the term to a simple extrapolation of Margot Adler's use of the term "Pagan reconstructionists" in the original, 1979 edition of Drawing Down the Moon.  Though Adler devotes space to a handful of Reconstructionist traditions, none of those mentioned are specifically Celtic. In chapter eleven, while describing his Neo-druidic group, New Reformed Druids of North America (NRDNA), Isaac Bonewits uses the phrase "Eclectic Reconstructionist." Eventually, this pairing of terms became oxymoronic; in the pagan/polytheist communities, reconstructionist had now come to mean traditions that specifically exclude eclecticism.

With the growth of the Internet during the 1990s, hundreds of individuals and groups gradually joined the discussions online and in print, and the movement became more of an umbrella group, with a number of recognized sub-traditions.

Practices
While the ancient Celtic religions were largely subsumed by Christianity, many religious traditions have survived in the form of folklore, mythology, songs, and prayers. Many folkloric practices never completely died out, and some Celtic Reconstructionists (CRs) claim to have survivals of Irish, Scottish or Welsh folkloric customs in their families of origin.

Language study and preservation, and participation in other cultural activities such as Celtic music, dance and martial arts forms, are seen as a core part of the tradition. Participation in the living Celtic cultures – the cultures that exist in the "areas in which Celtic languages are actually spoken and in which Celtic traditions have been most faithfully handed down to the present day" – is a vital part of their cultural work and spiritual practice. The protection of Celtic archaeological and sacred sites is important to Celtic Reconstructionists. When construction of the N3 motorway in Ireland threatened to destroy archaeological sites around the Hill of Tara, Celtic Reconstructionists (among others) organized protests and a coordinated ritual of protection.

Like many other modern pagan traditions, Celtic Reconstructionism has no sacred texts and so personal research is stressed. In order to more fully reconstruct pre-Christian Celtic religions, many CRs study archaeology, historical manuscripts, and comparative religion, primarily of Celtic cultures, but sometimes other European cultures, as well. Celtic Reconstructionists are not pan-Celtic in practice, but rather immerse themselves in a particular Celtic culture, such as Gaelic, Welsh or Gaulish. According to NicDhàna, CRs believe that while it is helpful to study a wide variety of Celtic cultures as an aid to religious reconstruction, and to have a broad understanding of religion in general, in practice these cultures are not lumped together. In addition to cultural preservation and scholarly research Celtic Reconstructionists believe that mystical, ecstatic practices are a necessary balance to scholarship, and that this balance is a vital component of any Celtic Reconstructionist tradition.

While CRs strive to revive the religious practices of historical Celtic peoples as accurately as possible, they acknowledge that some aspects of their religious practice are reconstructions. Celtic Reconstructionists state that their practices are based on cultural survivals, augmented with the study of early Celtic beliefs found in texts and the work of scholars and archaeologists. Feedback from scholars and experienced practitioners is sought before a new practice is accepted as a valid part of a reconstructed tradition.

Celtic Reconstructionists believe it is important to lay aside elements of ancient Celtic cultures which they consider inappropriate practices in a modern society. CRs attempt to find ethical ways of integrating historical findings and research with the activities of daily life. Many CRs view each act of daily life as a form of ritual, accompanying daily acts of purification and protection with traditional prayers and songs from sources such as the Scottish Gaelic Carmina Gadelica or manuscript collections of ancient Irish or Welsh poetry. Celebratory, community rituals are usually based on community festivals as recorded in folklore collections by authors such as F. Marian McNeill, Kevin Danaher or John Gregorson Campbell. These celebrations often involve bonfires, dances, songs, divination and children's games. More formal or mystical rituals are often based on traditional techniques of interacting with the Otherworld, such as the act of making offerings of food, drink and art to the spirits of the land, ancestral spirits, and the Celtic deities. CRs give offerings to the spirits throughout the year, but at Samhain, more elaborate offerings are made to specific deities and ancestors.

The ancient Irish swore their oaths by the "Three Realms" – Land, Sea, and Sky. Based on this precedent, reconstructed Gaelic ritual structures acknowledge the Land, Sea and Sky, with the fire of inspiration as a central force that unites the realms. Many Celtic Reconstructionists maintain altars and shrines to their patron spirits and deities, often choosing to place them at outdoor, natural locations such as wells, streams, and special trees. Some CRs practice divination; ogham is a favored method, as are folkloric customs such as the taking of omens from the shapes of clouds or the behavior of birds and animals.

Movement's labels

Overall tradition
NicDhàna and ní Dhoireann have stated that they coined the term "Celtic Reconstructionist / Celtic Reconstructionism (CR)" specifically to distinguish their practices and beliefs from those of eclectic traditions like Wicca and Neo-druidism. With ní Dhoireann's popularization of Celtic Reconstructionism in the neopagan press and then the use of the term by these individuals and others on the Internet, “Celtic Reconstructionism”  began to be adopted as the name for this developing spiritual tradition.

Gaelic traditionalism

Some groups that take a Celtic Reconstructionist approach to ancient Gaelic polytheism call themselves "Gaelic Traditionalists". Preservation of the living traditions in modern Gaelic (and other modern Celtic) communities has always been a priority in Celtic Reconstructionism. However, according to The CR FAQ there has been some controversy around the use of the term "Gaelic Traditionalists" by groups outside of the Gaeltacht and Gàidhealtachd areas of Ireland, Scotland and Nova Scotia. In the opinion of Isaac Bonewits this is partly because "Gaelic Traditionalists" is a term used almost exclusively by Celtic Christians.  As ní Dhoireann put it, "Gaelic Traditionalists" means "those living and raised in the living cultures and [who] are keeping their culture, language and music alive, not any of the American polytheistic groups that have been using it lately." The CR FAQ states that due to those in the Gaelic-speaking areas having a prior claim to the term, most Reconstructionists have been uncomfortable with the choice of other Reconstructionists to call themselves "Traditionalists", a sentiment which Bonewits echoes. According to the authors of The CR FAQ, while the disagreement over terminology has at times led to heated discussion, the polytheistic “traditionalists” and “reconstructionists” are taking the same approach to their religion, and there are generally good relations between the founders of both movements.

Sub-traditions
While Celtic Reconstructionism was the earliest term in use and still remains the most widespread, as the movement progressed other names for a Celtic Reconstructionist approach were also popularized, with varying degrees of success. Some CR groups have looked to the individual Celtic languages for a more culturally specific name for the tradition, or for their branch of the tradition.

Pàganachd/Págánacht

Some Gaelic-oriented groups have used the Scottish Gaelic,  ('Paganism, Heathenism') or the Irish version, .

Senistrognata

In 2000, IMBAS, A Celtic Reconstructionist organisation based in Seattle active during the late 1990s to early 2000s, adopted the name Senistrognata, a constructed "Old Celtic" term intended as translating to "ancestral customs".   is an Old Irish word meaning 'poetic inspiration'. The organization "promotes the spiritual path of Senistrognata, the ancestral customs of the Celtic peoples. It is a path open to Pagans, Christians, and Ag[n]ostics alike. This organization is currently inactive."

Others

Celtic Reconstructionism and Neo-druidism
Though there has been cross-pollination between Neo-druid and Celtic Reconstructionist groups, and there is significant crossover of membership between the two movements, the two have largely differing goals and methodologies in their approach to Celtic religious forms. Reconstructionists tend to place high priority on historical authenticity and traditional practice. Some Neo-druids tend to prefer a modern Pagan, eclectic approach, focusing on "the spirit of what they believe was the religious practice of pre-Roman Britain".

However, some Neo-druid groups (notably,  (ADF), the Order of Bards, Ovates and Druids (OBOD), and the Henge of Keltria) adopted similar methodologies of reconstruction, at least some of the time. ADF, in particular, has long used reconstructionist techniques, but the group has been criticized for their pan-Indo-European scope, which may result in non-Celtic combinations such as "Vedic druids" and "Roman druids".

Terminological differences exist as well, especially in terms of what druid means. Some Neo-druid groups call anyone with an interest in Celtic spirituality a "druid", and refer to the practice of any Celtic-inspired spirituality as "druidry", while reconstructionist groups usually use the older definition, seeing "druid" as a culturally-specific office that requires decades of training and experience, which is only attained by a small number of practitioners, and which must be conferred and confirmed by the community the druid serves.

See also

Ancient Celtic religion
Celt
Celtic mythology
Modern Celts
Polytheistic reconstructionism

Festivals

Imbolc
Beltane
Lughnasadh
Samhain

References

Further reading

Celtic Reconstructionism
Adler, Margot (1979) Drawing Down the Moon: Witches, Druids, Goddess-Worshippers, and Other Pagans in America Today
Bonewits, Isaac (2006) Bonewits's Essential Guide to Druidism. New York, Kensington Publishing Group  Chapter 9: "Celtic Reconstructionists and other Nondruidic Druids"
Fairgrove, Rowan (1994) What we don't know about the ancient Celts. Originally printed in The Pomegranate, 2. Now available online
Kondratiev, Alexei (1998) The Apple Branch: A Path to Celtic Ritual. San Francisco, Collins.  (1st edition),  (2nd edition). (Also reprinted without revision under the title Celtic Rituals.)
Laurie, Erynn Rowan (1995) A Circle of Stones: Journeys and Meditations for Modern Celts. Chicago, Eschaton. 
Laurie, Erynn Rowan (2007) Ogam: Weaving Word Wisdom. Megalithica Books. 
McColman, Carl (2003) The Complete Idiot's Guide to Celtic Wisdom. Alpha Press 
NicDhàna, Kathryn Price; Erynn Rowan Laurie, C. Lee Vermeers, Kym Lambert ní Dhoireann, et al. (2007) The CR FAQ — An Introduction to Celtic Reconstructionist Paganism. River House Publishing. 
 
Telesco, Patricia [editor] (2005) Which Witch is Which? Franklin Lakes, NJ, New Page Books / The Career Press , p. 85-9: "Celtic Reconstructionist Paganism"

Celtic polytheism and folklore

Celtic Reconstructionists rely on primary mythological texts, as well as surviving folklore, for the basis of their religious practices. No list can completely cover all the recommended works, but this is a small sample of sources used.

General Celtic

Evans Wentz, W. Y. (1966, 1990) The Fairy-Faith in Celtic Countries. Gerrards Cross, Colin Smythe Humanities Press 
MacCana, Proinsias (1970) Celtic Mythology. Middlesex, Hamlyn. 
MacKillop, James (1998) A Dictionary of Celtic Mythology. Oxford, Oxford University Press. 
Rees, Alwyn and Rees, Brinley (1961) Celtic Heritage: Ancient Tradition in Ireland and Wales. New York, Thames and Hudson. 
Sjoestedt, Marie-Louise (1982) Gods and Heroes of the Celts. Translated by Myles Dillon, Berkeley, CA, Turtle Island Foundation. 

Gaelic (Irish and Scottish)

Campbell, John Gregorson (1900, 1902, 2005) The Gaelic Otherworld.  Edited by Ronald Black. Edinburgh, Birlinn Ltd. 
Carmichael, Alexander (1992) Carmina Gadelica: Hymns and Incantations (with illustrative notes on wards, rites, and customs dying and obsolete/ orally collected in the highlands and islands of Scotland by Alexander Carmichael). Hudson, NY, Lindisfarne. 
Clark, Rosalind (1991) The Great Queens: Irish Goddesses from the Morrigan to Cathleen ni Houlihan. Savage, MD, Barnes and Noble Books. 
Danaher, Kevin (1972) The Year in Ireland.  Dublin, Mercier. 
Dillon, Myles (1994) Early Irish Literature. Dublin, Four Courts Press. 
Gray, Elizabeth A (1982) Cath Maige Tuired: The 2nd Battle of Mag Tuired. Dublin, Irish Texts Society
McNeill, F. Marian (1959). The Silver Bough, Vol. 1-4.  Glasgow, William MacLellan
Nagy, Joseph Falaky (1985) The Wisdom of the Outlaw: The Boyhood Deeds of Finn in Gaelic Narrative Tradition. Berkeley, University of California Press. 
Patterson, Nerys Thomas (1994) Cattle Lords and Clansmen: The Social Structure of Early Ireland. Notre Dame, IN, University of Notre Dame Press (2nd edition) 
Power, Patrick C. (1976) Sex and Marriage in Ancient Ireland. Dublin, Mercier
Smyth, Daragh (1988, 1996) A Guide to Irish Mythology. Dublin, Irish Academic Press

Comparative European

Davidson, H.R. Ellis (1988) Myths and Symbols in Pagan Europe: Early Scandinavian and Celtic Religions. Syracuse, Syracuse University Press. 
Epstein, Angelique Gulermovich (1998) War Goddess: The Morrígan and Her Germano-Celtic Counterparts. Los Angeles, University of California
Lincoln, Bruce (1991) Death, War, and Sacrifice: Studies in Ideology and Practice. Chicago, University of Chicago Press.

External links
The CR FAQ - An Introduction to Celtic Reconstructionist Paganism: Written by a collective of long-term members of the CR community and representatives of diverse CR sub-traditions — including some of the founders of the tradition — the FAQ is only the second document to present a consensus view that speaks for more than one group's vision.
Celtic Reconstructionist Paganism: The much-briefer consensus tradition statement from 2003. Contains unclear bits that were later cleared up in the FAQ, but a much quicker read than the FAQ.
What we mean by Celtic Reconstructionism: Statement from Imbas
FAQ RC – Uma Introdução ao Paganismo Reconstrucionista Celta - Portuguese translation of The CR FAQ.
Tairis - Collection of articles on Celtic Reconstructionism with a focus on Gaelic Polytheism
Land, Sea & Sky, edited by Shae Clancy and Francine Nicholson. Online anthology generally centered around Celtic mythology and Celtic Reconstructionism

Online portals
 CAORANN: Celts Against Oppression, Racism and Neo-Nazism
 Pàganachd / Págánacht: Home of the CR FAQ and other CR resources
 Gaol Naofa: A Gaelic Polytheist organisation
 Celtoi: A CR organisation based in Germany

Polytheistic reconstructionism
Celtic neopaganism
1990s in modern paganism